The Ninth Oklahoma Legislature was a meeting of the legislative branch of the government of Oklahoma, composed of the Oklahoma Senate and the Oklahoma House of Representatives. The state legislature met in Oklahoma City, in regular session from January 2 to March 31, 1923, during the short term of Governor Jack C. Walton, and in two special sessions after his impeachment.

Tom Anglin served as President pro tempore of the Oklahoma Senate and Murray Gibbons served as Speaker of the Oklahoma House of Representatives.

Dates of sessions
Regular session: January 2-March 31, 1923
First special session: October 11, 1923 – January 14, 1924
Second special session: January 15, 1924 – March 15, 1924
Previous: 8th Legislature • Next: 10th Legislature

Major events
The state legislature successfully impeached Governor Jack C. Walton, who was suspended on October 23, 1923, and convicted and removed from office of November 19, 1923. Lieutenant Governor Martin Trapp became acting governor upon his suspension and the sixth Governor of Oklahoma upon his conviction.
Soon after taking office, Trapp called the Oklahoma Legislature into special session to investigate state officials and agencies.

Party composition

Senate

House of Representatives

Leadership
Lieutenant Governor Martin Trapp served as President of the Senate until the suspension of the governor on October 23, 1923, and his conviction on November 19, 1923. Tom Anglin served as President pro tempore of the Oklahoma Senate. Murray Gibbons was Speaker of the Oklahoma House of Representatives.

Members

Senate

Table based on state almanac and list of all senators.

House of Representatives

Table based on government database.

References

External links
Oklahoma Legislature
Oklahoma House of Representatives
Oklahoma Senate

Oklahoma legislative sessions
1923 in Oklahoma
1924 in Oklahoma
1923 U.S. legislative sessions
1924 U.S. legislative sessions